Hamza Barry  (born 15 October 1994), commonly known simply as Hamza, is a Gambian professional footballer playing as a midfielder for Danish 1st Division side Vejle Boldklub.

Club career

Valletta
After playing for native side Gambia Ports Authority, Barry joined Maltese side Valletta in 2013. On 18 August 2013, Barry made his Valletta debut in a 2–1 victory over Mosta, playing the full 90 minutes. A few weeks later, Barry scored his first Valletta goal in a 3–2 defeat against Hibernians, scoring Valletta's second. In the 2014–15 campaign, Barry went on to score twelve times in twenty-eight league games, with a brace against four different teams; Pietà Hotspurs, Qormi, Sliema Wanderers and Tarxien Rainbows. by the end of 2014/15 playing season, Hamza was chosen by the Malta FA as the best young player of the year.

Apollon Limassol
On 1 July 2015, after impressing with Valletta, Barry joined Cypriot side Apollon Limassol on a one-year deal after rejecting a new deal in Malta.

Maccabi Netanya (loan)
On 14 August 2015, Barry was sent out on loan to Israeli Premier League side Maccabi Netanya. On 22 August 2015, Barry made his Maccabi Netanya debut in a 1–0 defeat against Maccabi Petah Tikva, playing the full 90 minutes. On 12 September 2015, Barry scored his first goal for Maccabi Netanya in a 1–1 draw against Hapoel Tel Aviv, netting in the 58th minute for Maccabi's equalizer. Due to Maccabi Netanya poor start to the campaign, parent club Apollon Limassol terminated Barry's loan, with a move to Hapoel Tel Aviv in mind. He returned to Apollon Limassol after starting twenty-one times and scoring twice for Maccabi Netanya.

Hapoel Tel Aviv (loan)
On 3 February 2016, Barry joined Hapoel Tel Aviv on loan for the remainder of the 2015–16 campaign. On 7 February 2016, Barry made his Hapoel Tel Aviv debut in a 1–1 draw against Maccabi Tel Aviv, playing the full 90 minutes. Barry went on to start the rest of his eleven appearances with Hapoel Tel Aviv before returning to Cyprus on 30 June 2016.

Hajduk Split
On 31 August 2016, Barry joined the Croatian team Hajduk Split, on a loan from Apollon Limassol with the option to purchase at the end of the season. Becoming a first team regular, his performances satisfied the club and Hajduk decided to buy his contract out for 250 000€, signing him for further three years. In his four years overall in the club Barry played a total of 133 matches for the Croatian club, scoring ten goals. His last match for the club would be in June 26th 2020, when, in a 2-1 win against Slaven Belupo Barry suffered a cruciate ligament rupture and was substituted off in the 84th minute of the game. He left the club following the expiry of his contract in the end of July 2020, and is due to return to the game following his recovery in the Spring of 2021.

LA Galaxy II
Barry joined USL Championship club LA Galaxy II, reserve team for Major League Soccer side LA Galaxy, ahead of their 2022 season.

Vejle
On 22 August 2022 it was confirmed, that Barry had joined newly relegated Danish 1st Division side Vejle Boldklub on a deal until June 2024.

Career statistics

References

External links
 
 Es.uefa.com
 Es.uefa.com
 Vimeo.com
 Timesofmalta.com

1994 births
Living people
Sportspeople from Banjul
Gambian footballers
Association football midfielders
Gambia Ports Authority FC players
Valletta F.C. players
Maccabi Haifa F.C. players
Maccabi Netanya F.C. players
Hapoel Tel Aviv F.C. players
HNK Hajduk Split players
LA Galaxy II players
Vejle Boldklub players
Maltese Premier League players
Israeli Premier League players
Croatian Football League players
The Gambia youth international footballers
The Gambia international footballers
Gambian expatriate footballers
Gambian expatriate sportspeople in Malta
Gambian expatriate sportspeople in Israel
Gambian expatriate sportspeople in Croatia
Gambian expatriate sportspeople in the United States
Gambian expatriate sportspeople in Denmark
Expatriate footballers in Malta
Expatriate footballers in Israel
Expatriate footballers in Croatia
Expatriate soccer players in the United States
Expatriate men's footballers in Denmark